Shiah Coore is a Jamaican musical artist and producer born in Kingston, Jamaica on 20 August 1979.

Biography  

Shiah Coore, firstborn to musician Cat Coore (Third World) and artisan Donna Feltis-Coore (Ital Craft), was born in Kingston Jamaica, 1979. As one of a handful of children belonging to the island’s reggae-elite, Shiah Coore was raised in the music industry. He showed interest for music early in life, performing living room shows with Damian Marley at 6. The Shepherds was later developed by Donna Feltis-Coore after she put an advertisement in the newspaper to find other members and named the band. The members of the band were Shiah Coore’s lifelong friend Damian Marley, Yashema Beth Mc Gregor, daughter of Freddie McGregor and Judy Mowatt, Richard Bertrand and Noel Parks, son of Lloyd Parks. They would later perform together at Sunsplash 1991.

Shiah Coore later attended the Jamaica School of Music, playing bass guitar under the instruction of Maurice Gordon. Then submitted an audition tape featuring his best scales and patterns to Berklee College of Music in Boston, MA, and in the fall of ’99 entered on a scholarship, Here he furthered his bass studies with Rich Appleman and Danny Morris and also began to explore music production and engineering. To date, his bass tones can be heard on album recordings with NAS, Joss Stone, AR Rahman, Third World, Mick Jagger, Chronixx, Eric Clapton, Dave Stewart, Damian and Stephen Marley or on the SuperHeavy project. Since 2003, he is touring as a bass player with Damian Marley.

As a producer, Shiah Coore is the creator of 'Mad Ants Riddim' , other notable work include contributions to Sizzla’s ‘Rise to the Occasion’, Wayne Wonder ‘No Holding back’, Damian Marley’s ‘Welcome To JamRock (Grammy winner), Nas and Damian Marley’s Distant Relatives (2010). As well as tracks for Vybz Kartel, Busy Signal, Chronixx, Sizzla, Beenie Man, Bounty Killa. Shiah Coore launches his own label « Shiah Records » in 2012.

Discography

Musician 

Sources (1 and 2)

Producer and Composer 

Sources (1 and 2)

References 

1. 2009, Oxford University Press, The Encyclopedia of Popular Music, Collin Larkin

2. 2016, Reggae.fr, Damian Marley's interview

3. Music Credits : http://www.allmusic.com/artist/shiah-coore-mn0000748723/credits

4. Music Credits : http://www.artistdirect.com/artist/credits/shiah-coore/2961635

5. "Damian Marley, Following in his Fathers Footsteps", Zachary Cichocki

1979 births
living people
musicians from Kingston, Jamaica
Jamaican reggae musicians
Jamaican male musicians